Rajamani Velraj is an Indian cinematographer, director and writer who primarily works in Tamil films. He is well known for his camera work in films like Asuran, Aadukalam, Vada Chennai, Kadaikutty Singam and Komban, and for directing Velaiilla Pattadhari and Thanga Magan. He is one of the member of  Indian Society of Cinematographers

Personal life 
Rajamani Velraj was born in a village called Kootthiyar Kundu near Madurai, Tamil Nadu. He went to PKN Boys Higher Secondary School (Tirumangalam), and studied at Madurai Sourastra College. He is married with two children’s

Career 
Early in his career, he worked as an assistant to ace cinematographer Tirru in several Tamil films. After working with actor Dhanush in Parattai Engira Azhagu Sundaram, Dhanush recommended Velraj for his next film, Polladhavan, directed by debutant, Vetrimaaran. He won the Vijay Award for Best Cinematographer in 2008. Velraj and Vetrimaaran continued working together, from Aadukalam to their most recent film, Asuran.He has collaborated with many commercially successful directors . He made his directional debut with Velaiilla Pattadhari, starring Dhanush and Amala Paul and with Anirudh as the music director. The film was extremely successful and became a cult film. In 2015, he directed his second film, Thanga Magan.
Velraj is a member of the Indian Society of Cinematographers. His recent film Viduthalai part : 1 (2023) is one of the most awaited film of the year.

Filmography

As cinematographer

As director

As actor 
Poriyalan (2014)
Kaalidas (2019)
Asuran (2019)
Udanpirappe (2021)
Kuttram Kuttrame (2022)

Awards
 2007- Vijay Award for Best Cinematographer for Pollathavan
 2011- Filmfare Award for Best Cinematographer – South for Aadukalam.
 2011- SIIMA Award for Best Cinematographer for Aadukalam
 2014-SIIMA Award for Best Debut Director for Velaiyilla Pattathari
 2019-SIIMA Award for Best cinematographer for Asuran

References

External links 

Cinematographers from Tamil Nadu
Living people
People from Madurai district
1969 births
Tamil film cinematographers
Filmfare Awards South winners